Mary Anne Meacham (July 21, 1925—January 12, 2006) was a noted American actress of stage, film and television.

Born and raised in Chicago, Meacham left to study drama at Yale University, graduating with a degree in 1947.

New York stage
Meacham debuted on Broadway as Ensign Jane Hilton in 1952's The Long Watch (written by Harvey Haislip), for which she received a Clarence Derwent Award, given to outstanding newcomers to the New York stage.

She is most famous for her roles on and off-Broadway, most notably in adaptations of plays written by Tennessee Williams, who was a close friend. Williams once wrote an editorial in The New York Times praising Meacham, noting "There's nothing she won't say or do onstage without any sign of embarrassment".

She also portrayed roles in the Broadway productions of 
Candide and A Passage to India. She won two Best Actress Obie Awards, one for her role as "Catherine Holly" (the first actress to play the role which was later essayed by Elizabeth Taylor in the film version) in Tennessee Williams
Suddenly, Last Summer (1958) and another for the title role in Henrik Ibsen's Hedda Gabler (1961).

She also appeared in The Gnädiges Fräulein in 1966, and In the Bar of a Tokyo Hotel in 1969. Her final Broadway credit was as Queen Gertrude in Rosencrantz and Guildenstern Are Dead in 1968. All of her stage appearances after 1968 (including In the Bar of a Tokyo Hotel) were off-Broadway.

Television
In 1962 Meacham appeared as Sarah Lilly on the TV western The Virginian in the episode titled "The Brazen Bell." On television, she was most famous for playing the eccentric maid, "Louise Goddard", on Another World. She played the role from 1972 to 1982. Meacham's character was most recognized for naming all of the Cory family's houseplants, which numbered well into the dozens.

The trademark of the Another World casting department was to hire heavily from the New York City stage, and it was noted by author Annie Gilbert in the book, All My Afternoons, that Meacham was one of the many cast members taken from this genre to infuse strong acting performances into the show, due to her experience.

Death
Anne Meacham died from undisclosed causes in Canaan, New York on January 12, 2006, at the age of 80. Her death was reported by her friend, actress Marian Seldes.

Filmography

References

External links
 
 
 

1925 births
2006 deaths
American film actresses
American soap opera actresses
American stage actresses
Clarence Derwent Award winners
Actresses from Chicago
Yale School of Drama alumni
20th-century American actresses
21st-century American women